Phorticosomus is a genus of beetles in the family Carabidae, containing the following species:

 Phorticosomus castelnaui Sloane, 1915
 Phorticosomus crassus Sloane, 1915
 Phorticosomus edelii Castelnau, 1867
 Phorticosomus felix Schaum, 1863
 Phorticosomus franzi Baehr, 1998
 Phorticosomus grandis Castelnau, 1867
 Phorticosomus gularis Sloane, 1915
 Phorticosomus horni Sloane, 1896
 Phorticosomus macleayi Sloane, 1915
 Phorticosomus mucronatus Blackburn, 1888
 Phorticosomus nuytsii Castelnau, 1867
 Phorticosomus piceus Sloane, 1915
 Phorticosomus randalli Blackburn, 1890
 Phorticosomus robustus Blackburn, 1889
 Phorticosomus rotundatus Moore, 1967
 Phorticosomus rugiceps Macleay, 1871
 Phorticosomus similis Blackburn, 1888
 Phorticosomus zabroides Sloane, 1910

References

Harpalinae